is a Japanese anime producer and music producer. Formerly an employee of Victor Entertainment, he founded and has been the representative director of its sublabel, Flying Dog, since its inception in 2007. In his time working as a music producer and project developer he's helped launch the careers of musicians Yoko Kanno, Yuki Kajiura, May'n and singer and voice actress Maaya Sakamoto.

Staff in
Noir (2001)

Notes

References

External links
 
 

1958 births
Japanese record producers
Japanese television producers
Living people